Ackerman syndrome or interstitial granulomatous dermatitis is a familial syndrome of fused molar roots with a single canal (taurodontism), hypotrichosis, full upper lip without a cupid's bow, thickened and wide philtrum, and occasional juvenile glaucoma.
It was described by James L. Ackerman, A. Leon Ackerman, and A. Bernard Ackerman.

Signs and symptoms 
 Fused molar roots
 Single root canal
 Juvenile glaucoma
 Sparse body hair
 Distinct facial features: full upper lip, absence of cupid's bow, thick philtrum
 Syndactyly
 Increased pigmentation of finger joints
 Clinodactyly of fifth finger.

Diagnosis

Treatment

References

External links 

 

Rare genetic syndromes
Syndromes affecting teeth
Syndromes with craniofacial abnormalities
Syndromes with dysmelia